Eiavatnet is a lake in Rogaland county, Norway. The lake is regulated at an elevation of  so it can be used as a reservoir for the Lindland Power Station which is located a short distance north of Hauge in Sokndal.

See also
List of lakes in Norway

References

Eigersund
Sokndal
Lakes of Rogaland